Natt is an English surname.  Notable people with the surname include:

Calvin Natt (born 1957), American basketball player in the National Basketball Association
Chris Natt (born 1952), Australian politician and Australian rules footballer
Kenny Natt (born 1958), American basketball player and coach, brother of Calvin Natt
Phoebe Davis Natt (1848–1899), American painter
Ted Natt (1941–1999), American publisher

English-language surnames